BLACK GIRLS ROCK! is a company founded by executive producer, businesswoman, celebrity DJ, and former model Beverly Bond. The company hosts an annual award show of the same name that honors and promotes Black women's achievements. BLACK GIRLS ROCK! also has a nonprofit arm  that teaches leadership skills and develops confidence in teenage girls through its annual "BLACK GIRLS LEAD" conference.

History

BLACK GIRLS ROCK! was founded by celebrity DJ and model Beverly Bond in 2006. The inaugural BLACK GIRLS ROCK! AWARDS ceremony honored rapper MC Lyte and DJ Jazzy Joyce at powerHouse Arena, an art gallery and powerHouse Books location in DUMBO, Brooklyn.  For the second annual BLACK GIRLS ROCK! Awards the organization honored Missy Elliott, Sylvia Rhone, and DJ Diamond Kuts at Jazz at Lincoln Center in New York City with actress Regina King as its host. The organization continued to independently produce its annual award show in New York City until 2009. In 2008 Regina King hosted the award show again and in 2009 the award show was co-hosted by Regina King and Tracee Ellis Ross.

In 2010 BLACK GIRLS ROCK! collaborated with BET to bring its annual award ceremony to television.  The award show aired on BET from 2010 through 2019. In 2021, Beverly Bond, launched BGR!TV Networks, which streams original content celebrating Black women and girls including the BLACK GIRLS ROCK! Awards. The BGR!TV Networks first program was the BLACK GIRLS ROCK! 15th-anniversary Fundraising Gala which was headlined by Chaka Khan and featured Grammy-nominated artists Alice Smith and Maimouna Youssef, a.k.a. MuMu Fresh; D.C.'s all-woman go-go band Bela Dona; Grammy Award-winning gospel singer Tasha Cobbs Leonard; celebrity DJ Active; and an exclusive collaboration with Chaka Khan and Def Leppard lead guitarist Phil Collen.

In 2019, in collaboration with the John F. Kennedy Center for the Performing Arts in Washington, DC, BLACK GIRLS ROCK! hosted BGR!Fest. The three-day celebration was timed to coincide with International Women's Day, and included a dance party and a weekend of music performances. A second BGR!Fest was held in 2020, The Kennedy Center announced that the BGR!FEST will return in March 2022 and BLACK GIRLS ROCK! is currently collaborating with the National Symphony Orchestra to produce another event at the John F. Kennedy Center for the Performing Arts.

BLACK GIRLS ROCK! also holds an annual BLACK GIRLS LEAD conference for girls and hosts educational STEM programs through its platform Girls Rock Tech!

Award Show
Each year, BLACK GIRLS ROCK! celebrants are recognized in categories including, but not limited to, "The Rock Star", "Social Humanitarian", "Who Got Next?", "Living Legend", "Shot Caller", "Trailblazer", "Motivator", "Young, Gifted & Black", "Star Power", "Icon" or "Visionary" award. The program features musical performances by female recording artists in the R&B and Soul music genres. Notable speakers have included Michelle Obama (2015) and Hillary Clinton (2016).

Since its first televised ceremony on Nov 7, 2010, Black Girls Rock! has become an annually televised event on BET and BET Her. That year the ceremony was hosted by actress Nia Long and featured recognitions and musical performances by SWV, Coko, Raven-Symoné, Keke Palmer, Ruby Dee, Teresa Clarke, Marcelite J. Harris, Iyanla Vanzant, Kelly Price, VV Brown, Keyshia Cole, Marsha Ambrosius, Jill Scott, Ledisi, Keri Hilson, Ciara, and Missy Elliott.

The 2013 show garnered over 2.7 million television viewers.  Since 2015, the annual ceremony has been produced from Newark's New Jersey Performing Arts Center.

The 2019 event was hosted by actress Niecy Nash on August 25, 2019 and aired on September 8, 2019 on BET.

The award show has won the NAACP Image Award for Outstanding Variety in the Series of Special category three times (2013, 2017, 2019) and been nominated five times.

Honorees

2006 
Pioneer Award  DJ Jazzy Joyce

Icon Award  MC Lyte

2007 
Creative Visionary Award  Missy Elliott
 DJ Jazzy Joyce Award  DJ Diamond Cuts
 Corporate Award  Sylvia Rhone

2008
 Rock Star Award  Erykah Badu
 Monument Award  Nicole Paultre-Bell and Valerie Bell
 Shot Caller Award   Bethann Hardison
 Fashionista Award  June Ambrose
 Living Legend Award  Pam Grier
 Social Humanitarian Award  Iman
 Become Legendary Award  April Holmes

2009
 Community Service Award  Dr. Mehret Mandefro
 Fashionista Award  Naomi Campbell
 Who Got Next Award  Janelle Monáe
 Jazzy Joyce DJ Award  Spinderella
 Young, Gifted and Black Award  Raven-Symoné
 Living Legend Award  Dr. Sonia Sanchez
 Shot Caller Award  Iyanla Vanzant
 Rock Star Award  Queen Latifah
 Icon Award  Mary J. Blige

2010
 Young, Gifted & Black Award  Raven-Symoné
 Visionary Award  Missy Elliott
 Who Got Next? Award  Keke Palmer
 Shot Caller Award  Teresa Clarke
 Living Legend Award  Ruby Dee
 Trailblazer Award  Major General Marcelite J. Harris
 Motivator Award  Rev. Dr. Iyanla Vanzant

2011
 Young, Black & Gifted Award  Tatyana Ali
 Star Power Award  Taraji P. Henson
 Shot Caller Award  Laurel J. Richie
 Living Legend Award  Shirley Caesar
 Icon Award  Angela Davis
 Trailblazer Awards  Imani Walker and Malika Saada Saar

2012
 Rock Star Award  Alicia Keys
 Young Gifted and Black Award  Janelle Monáe
 Star Power Award  Kerry Washington
 Living Legend Award  Dionne Warwick
 Inspiration Award  Susan L. Taylor
 Social Humanitarian Award  Dr. Hawa Abdi, Dr. Deqo Mohamed and Dr. Amina Mohamed

2013
 Rock Star Award  Queen Latifah
 Young, Gifted & Black Award  Misty Copeland
 Star Power Award  Venus Williams
 Living Legend Award  Patti LaBelle
 Social Humanitarian Award  Marian Wright Edelman
 Community Activist Award  Ameena Matthews

2015
 Rock Star Award  Erykah Badu
 Shot Caller Award  Ava DuVernay
 Star Power Award  Jada Pinkett Smith
 Living Legend Award  Cicely Tyson
 Social Humanitarian Award  Dr. Helene D. Gayle
 Change Agent Award  Nadia Lopez

2016
 Rock Star Celebrant  Rihanna
 Shot Caller Celebrant  Shonda Rhimes
 Young, Gifted and Black Celebrant  Amandla Stenberg
 Star Power Celebrant  Danai Gurira
 Living Legend Celebrant  Gladys Knight
 Community Change Agent Celebrants  Alicia Garza, Patrisse Cullors and Opal Tometi

2017
 Rock Star Celebrant  Solange
 Shot Caller Celebrant  Suzanne Shank
 Social Humanitarian Celebrant  Maxine Waters
 Star Power Celebrant  Issa Rae
 Living Legend Celebrant  Roberta Flack
 Community Change Agent Celebrants  Natalie and Derrica Wilson
 Young Gifted And Black Celebrant  Yara Shahidi

2018
 Rock Star Celebrant  Janet Jackson
 Star Power Award  Mary J Blige
 Living Legend Award  Judith Jamison
 Black Girl Magic  Naomi Campbell
 Shot Caller Award  Lena Waithe
 Community Change Agent Award  Tarana Burke

2019
 Icon Award  Angela Bassett
 Star Power Award  Regina King
 Rock Star Award  Ciara
 Young, Gifted & Black Award  H.E.R.
 Shot Caller Award  Debra Martin Chase
 Community Change Agent Award  Gwen Carr, Lucy McBath, Geneva Reed-Veal, Cleopatra Cowley-Pendleton, Maria Hamilton, Sybrina Fulton

2018 Book: Black Girls Rock! Owning Our Magic. Rocking Our Truth. 
In February 2018, Simon & Schuster published Black Girls Rock! Owning Our Magic. Rocking Our Truth. The book was edited by Beverly Bond and features insights from nearly sixty influential Black women, including Michelle Obama, Angela Davis, Shonda Rhimes, Misty Copeland, Yara Shahidi, and Mary J. Blige.

References

External links
Black Girls Rock, Inc. Official Website
BET Site

Awards established in 2006